Meskla (Μεσκλά) is a village in the municipality of Platanias, a regional unit of Chania, western Crete, in Greece. According to the 2011 census it has 333 inhabitants. It is built on an altitude of 200 meters, at the northern foothills of the White Mountains, in the valley of the river Keritis. It is 21 km away from the city of Chania and 4 km from the village of Fournes. In the past it was a community of the province of Kydonia which included, besides Meskla, the village of Zourva.

Population

References 

Populated places in Crete
Chania (regional unit)